Scott Dacko is the screenwriter and director of The Insurgents, starring Mary Stuart Masterson, John Shea, Henry Simmons, Juliette Marquis and Michael Mosley. Winner of the German Independence Audience Award for Best Picture for The Insurgents at the 2006 Oldenburg International Film Festival at the world premiere of his debut film. Winner of the Best Screenplay award at his US premiere at the 2007 Palm Beach International Film Festival.  Winner of Best Feature at the 2007 Long Island International Film Expo.

Filmography
The Insurgents (2007)

External links

References
Making an Indie Film by Cade Metz, PC Magazine, May 3, 2006.
Oldenburg International Film Festival

American film directors
Living people
Year of birth missing (living people)
Place of birth missing (living people)